Being Bisexual is a 2017 BBC World Service 30 minute radio documentary special about life as a bisexual. It was led by Nichi Hodgson.

See also
 Bisexuality in entertainment

References

Further reading

External links
 Being Bisexual at Bbc.co.uk

Documentaries about LGBT topics
Documentaries about sexuality
Works about bisexuality
Mass media portrayals of bisexuality
BBC World Service programmes
Radio documentaries
Documentary specials